The following are the appointments to various Canadian Honours of 2011. Usually, they are announced as part of the New Year and Canada Day celebrations and are published within the Canada Gazette during year. This follows the custom set out within the United Kingdom which publishes its appoints of various British Honours for New Year's and for monarch's official birthday. However, instead of the midyear appointments announced on Victoria Day, the official birthday of the Canadian Monarch, this custom has been transferred with the celebration of Canadian Confederation and the creation of the Order of Canada.

However, as the Canada Gazette publishes appointment to various orders, decorations and medal, either Canadian or from Commonwealth and foreign states, this article will reference all Canadians so honoured during the 2011 calendar year.

Provincial Honours are not listed within the Canada Gazette, however they are listed within the various publications of each provincial government. Provincial honours are listed within the page.

The Order of Canada

Officer of the Order of Canada

 Nicole Brossard, O.C. 
 Sylvia R. Cruess, O.C. 
 James A. Dosman, O.C., S.O.M. 
 The Honourable René Dussault, O.C., O.Q. 
 Angela Enright, O.C. 
 Clément Gosselin, O.C. 
 Linda Hutcheon, O.C. 
 Anthony Edward Thomas Lang, O.C. 
 Maurice McGregor, O.C., C.Q. 
 Shelagh Rogers, O.C. .
 Mary Vingoe, O.C. 
 Harry Walsh, O.C.
 André D. Bandrauk, O.C. 
 William Buyers, O.C. 
 The Honourable Herménégilde Chiasson, O.C. 
 Lorna Crozier, O.C. 
 Alain Lefèvre, O.C., C.Q. 
 Terence Macartney-Filgate, O.C. 
 Denis Marleau, O.C., C.Q. 
 Bob McDonald, O.C. 
 Maureen O’Neil, O.C. 
 Viola Robinson, O.C., O.N.S. 
 Maureen Sabia, O.C. 
 Peter Alexander Singer, O.C.
 Annette Verschuren, O.C. 
 Hayley Wickenheiser, O.C. 
 Ronald G. Worton, O.C. - This is a promotion within the Order

Members of the Order of Canada

 Patricia Aldana, C.M. 
 Marthe Asselin-Vaillancourt, C.M., C.Q. 
 Bernard Blishen, C.M. 
 Robert Bourdeau, C.M.
 Ronald Caplan, C.M. 
 Marc Chouinard, C.M. 
 The Honourable Erminie J. Cohen, C.M. 
 Anthony Comper, C.M. 
 Elizabeth Comper, C.M. 
 Paul Copeland, C.M. 
 Ollie Currie, C.M. 
 Pierre Fréchette, C.M., C.Q. 
 Monique Giroux, C.M. 
 David Halliday, C.M.
 Robert D. Hare, C.M. 
 Hanny A. Hassan, C.M. 
 Michael Hayden, C.M., O.B.C. 
 Martha Lou Henley, C.M.
 Ellis Jacob, C.M. 
 Gilles Julien, C.M. 
 Jamie Kennedy, C.M. 
 Derek Key, C.M., O.P.E.I. 
 Camille Limoges, C.M. 
 Trevor Linden, C.M., O.B.C. 
 Joy Maclaren, C.M. 
 John McLaughlin, C.M., O.N.B. 
 Howard (Howie) W. Meeker, C.M. 
 Gwyn Morgan, C.M. 
 Daniel Nestor, C.M. 
 Rudolph North, C.M. 
 Eric Peterson, C.M. 
 Shirley Post, C.M. 
 Terrence Punch, C.M. 
 Charlene M. T. Robertson, C.M. 
 Jennifer Simons, C.M. 
 Tricia Smith, C.M. 
 Mavis Staines, C.M. 
 Beth Symes, C.M. 
 Robert H. Taylor, C.M. 
 Robert C. P. Westbury, C.M. 
 Edwina Wetzel, C.M. 
 Christopher Wiseman, C.M.
 Arnold Aberman, C.M. 
 Shirley Bear, C.M. 
 Jeanne Besner, C.M. 
 Anita Best, C.M. 
 John M. W. Bradford, C.M. 
 The Honourable Patricia Carney, P.C., C.M. 
 Vera Dewar, C.M. 
 Joan Donald, C.M. 
 Frank F. Fagan, C.M. 
 Mary Lou Fallis, C.M. 
 Edra Sanders Ferguson, C.M. 
 Jean-Claude Fouron, C.M. 
 Marie Gignac, C.M. 
 John H. V. Gilbert, C.M. 
 Malcolm Gladwell, C.M. 
 Dorothy Griffiths, C.M., O.Ont. 
 Paul Valdemar (Valdy) Horsdal, C.M. 
 Frederick Hyndman, C.M.
 Frederic L. R. Jackman, C.M., O.Ont. 
 Ruth E. Kajander, C.M. 
 Josef Kates, C.M. 
 Pierre Lavoie, C.M., C.Q., 
 Eugene Levy, C.M. 
 Pierre Maranda, C.M. 
 Robert Y. McMurtry, C.M. 
 Alvaro Morales, C.M. 
 Larry Nelson, C.M. 
 Pierre Nepveu, C.M. 
 Samantha Joan Nutt, C.M., O.Ont. S
 Nino Ricci, C.M. 
 Bernard Saladin d’Anglure, C.M.
 David William Shannon, C.M., O.Ont. 
 David Staines, C.M., O.Ont. 
 F. Thomas Stanfield, C.M. 
 W. Brett Wilson, C.M.

Order of Military Merit

Commanders of the Order of Military Merit

 Rear-Admiral Nigel Stafford Greenwood, C.M.M., C.D. - This is a promotion within the Order
 Major-General Joseph Marcel Marquis Hainse, C.M.M., C.D. - this is a promotion within the Order
 Major-General Tom James Lawson, C.M.M., C.D. This is a promotion within the Order
 Rear-Admiral Paul Andrew Maddison, C.M.M., M.S.M., C.D. - This is a promotion within the Order
 Major-General Mark Edmund McQuillan, C.M.M., C.D. 
 Major-General Guy Robert Thibault, C.M.M., C.D.

Officers of the Order of Military Merit

 Captain(N) Scott Edward George Bishop, O.M.M., C.D. 
 Lieutenant-Colonel Allan Eric Bratland, O.M.M., C.D.
 Lieutenant-Colonel Kevin Francis Bryski, O.M.M., C.D.
 Major James Randall Burton, O.M.M., C.D. 
 Colonel Kenneth André Corbould, O.M.M., C.D. 
 Commander Anthony Robert Evans, O.M.M., C.D. 
 Lieutenant-Commander Cindy Bernadette Galt, O.M.M., C.D. 
 Colonel Martin Girard, O.M.M., C.D. 
 Brigadier-General Paul-Émilien Richard Simon Hébert, O.M.M., C.D.
 Colonel David Gerald Henley, O.M.M., C.D. 
 Lieutenant-Colonel Patricia Henry, O.M.M., C.D. 
 Colonel Jean-Marc Lanthier, O.M.M., M.S.C., M.S.M., C.D. 
 Commander Robert Lewis-Manning, O.M.M., C.D. 
 Lieutenant-Colonel Deborah Lynn McKenzie, O.M.M., C.D. 
 Lieutenant-Colonel Shawn Darric McKinstry, O.M.M., C.D.
 Lieutenant-Colonel Darryl Albert Mills, O.M.M., M.S.C., C.D. 
 Colonel Richard Francis Pucci, O.M.M., C.D. 
 Lieutenant-Colonel Joseph Joël Roy, O.M.M., C.D.
 Colonel James Baxter Simms, O.M.M., C.D. 
 Captain(N) Martin William Teft, O.M.M., C.D. 
 Lieutenant-Colonel Homer Chin-nan Tien, O.M.M., C.D. 
 Chief Warrant Officer Bernard Joseph Noël Verreault, O.M.M., C.D.- This is a promotion within the Order
 Lieutenant-Colonel Lawrence James Zaporzan, O.M.M., C.D.

Members of the Order of Military Merit

 Sergeant Jorgan Aitaok, M.M.M., C.D. (Canadian Ranger)
 Chief Warrant Officer Mark Arden, M.M.M., C.D. 
 Chief Warrant Officer Denise Aimee Ballermann, M.M.M., C.D. 
 Master Warrant Officer Robert Paul Bartlett, M.M.M., C.D. 
 Chief Warrant Officer Joseph Yvan Denis Bédard, M.M.M., C.D. 
 Chief Warrant Officer Joseph Bernard Alain Bergeron, M.M.M., C.D.
 Chief Warrant Officer Gerard Joseph Brennan, M.M.M., C.D. 
 Major Patrick Albert Denis Brizay, M.M.M., C.D. 
 Master Warrant Officer Kirby Vincent Burgess, M.M.M., C.D. 
 Petty Officer 1st Class Joseph François Luc Champagne,M.M.M., C.D.
 Sergeant Joseph Jacques Mario Charette, M.M.M., M.B., C.D. 
 Chief Petty Officer 1st Class Malcom Derek Conlon, M.M.M., C.D.
 Captain Joseph Charles Serge Côté, M.M.M., C.D. 
 Sergeant Russell Wayne Coughlin, M.M.M., C.D. 
 Chief Warrant Officer Bernard Joseph Curtis, M.M.M., C.D. 
 Chief Warrant Officer William Darling, M.M.M., C.D. 
 Warrant Officer Robert Allan David, M.M.M., C.D. 
 Master Warrant Officer Joseph Raymond Yves Demers, M.M.M., C.D.
 Warrant Officer William Francis Doupe, M.M.M., C.D. 
 Master Warrant Officer Stephen Christopher Downey, M.M.M., C.D.
 Chief Petty Officer 1st Class Walter Joseph Bernard Dubeau, M.M.M., C.D.
 Chief Warrant Officer Joseph Peter Dulong, M.M.M., C.D. 
 Captain Sylvain Charles Falle, M.M.M., C.D. 
 Chief Petty Officer 1st Class Michael Craig Feltham, M.M.M., C.D.
 Chief Petty Officer 2nd Class Richard Alton Fisher, M.M.M., C.D.
 Sergeant Lorne Emerson Lionel Ford, M.M.M., C.D. 
 Warrant Officer Melina Dorothy Ann Fournier, M.M.M., C.D.
 Major Carl Gauthier, M.M.M., C.D.
 Chief Warrant Officer Daphine Viola Germain, M.M.M., C.D. 
 Lieutenant(N) Corey Lloyd Ellis Gleason, M.M.M., C.D. 
 Chief Warrant Officer Joseph Ernest Gilles Godbout, M.M.M., C.D.
 Chief Warrant Officer Joseph Lucien Éric Gravel, M.M.M., C.D. 
 Chief Warrant Officer Gerald Olympe Gravelle, M.M.M., C.D. 
 Chief Warrant Officer Alain Grenier, M.M.M., C.D. 
 Warrant Officer Sean Michael Hansen, M.M.M., C.D. 
 Captain Paul Henry Hartinger, M.M.M., C.D. 
 Captain John Douglas Hill, M.M.M., C.D. 
 Master Warrant Officer Richard David Hills, M.M.M., C.D. 
 Warrant Officer Murray Clair Hiltz, M.M.M., C.D. 
 Warrant Officer Kevin Thomas Johnson, M.M.M., M.S.M., C.D. 
 Master Warrant Officer Edward James Kilcup, M.M.M., C.D. 
 Master Warrant Officer Marc Daniel Lafontaine, M.M.M., C.D. 
 Master Warrant Officer William Kenneth Laing, M.M.M., C.D.
 Chief Petty Officer 2nd Class Stephen Joseph Lamarche, M.M.M., C.D.
 Sergeant Frédéric Gilles Joseph Lavoie, M.M.M., C.D. 
 Warrant Officer Robert Ronald Leblanc, M.M.M., C.D. 
 Petty Officer 2nd Class James Anthony Leith, M.M.M., S.C., M.S.M., C.D.
 Chief Warrant Officer Robert Colin MacDonald, M.M.M., C.D. 
 Master Warrant Officer Donald Nolan MacIntyre, M.M.M., C.D. 
 Petty Officer 1st Class Arthur Wilberforce MacLeod, M.M.M., C.D.
 Warrant Officer Patricia Susan MacWilliams, M.M.M., C.D. 
 Captain William McAuley, M.M.M., C.D. 
 Chief Petty Officer 1st Class Michael Daniel McCallum, M.M.M., C.D.
 Warrant Officer Craig Richard McKay, M.M.M., C.D. 
 Major Wendy Mae McKenzie, M.M.M., C.D. 
 Warrant Officer David Francis McLaughlin, M.M.M., C.D. 
 Master Warrant Officer Shawn Anthony Mercer, M.M.M., M.S.M., C.D.
 Master Warrant Officer Kenneth Miles, M.M.M., C.D. 
 Chief Warrant Officer Steven Maurice Milton, M.M.M., C.D. 
 Captain William English Moore, M.M.M., C.D. 
 Master Warrant Officer Marie Rose Christine Ouellet, M.M.M., C.D.
 Warrant Officer Bryan Keith Pierce, C.V., M.M.M., M.S.C., C.D. 
 Master Warrant Officer Roy Harold Pugh, M.M.M., C.D. 
 Chief Warrant Officer Joseph Vernon Pynn, M.M.M., C.D. 
 Major Douglas Reid, M.M.M., C.D. 
 Chief Petty Officer 1st Class Thomas Christopher Riefesel, M.M.M., C.D.
 Master Warrant Officer Joseph Henry Sampson, M.M.M., C.D. 
 Chief Warrant Officer Joseph Normand Yvon Sauvageau, M.M.M., C.D.
 Chief Warrant Officer Jean-Paul Savoie, M.M.M., C.D. 
 Chief Petty Officer 2nd Class Angela Lynne Schenkers, M.M.M., C.D.
 Warrant Officer Marie Lucette Sylvie Seaward, M.M.M., C.D. 
 Master Warrant Officer Patrick Henry Simms, M.M.M., C.D. 
 Warrant Officer Wayde Lee Simpson, M.M.M., M.B., C.D. 
 Master Warrant Officer Carol Snow, M.M.M., C.D. 
 Chief Warrant Officer Andrew Peter Stapleford, M.M.M., C.D. 
 Captain Terrence Gordon Stead, M.M.M., C.D. 
 Master Warrant Officer Keith Charles Thibault, M.M.M., C.D. 
 Chief Warrant Officer David Charles Tofts, M.M.M., C.D. 
 Master Warrant Officer Guy Tremblay, M.M.M., C.D. 
 Chief Warrant Officer Joseph Louis Philippe Turbide, M.M.M., C.D.
 Captain Joseph Napoléon Denis Veilleux, M.M.M., C.D. 
 Petty Officer 1st Class Paul Joseph Walsh, M.M.M., C.D.
 Master Warrant Officer Lise Marie Juliette Ward, M.M.M., C.D. 
 Captain Shannon Marie Wills, M.M.M., C.D. 
 Master Warrant Officer John Cameron Winters, M.M.M., C.D.

Order of Merit of the Police Forces

Officers of the Order of Merit of the Police Forces

 Assistant Commissioner Line Carbonneau
 Director General Robert Fahlman
 Chief Robert Herman
 Deputy Chief Constable Warren Lemcke
 Chief Dale R. McFee (promotion within the Order)
 Superintendent Brian Simpson
 Chief A. Paul Smith
 Chief Wendy Southall

Members of the Order of Merit of the Police Forces

 Deputy Chief Danny Aikman
 Director Serge Bélisle
 Deputy Chief Gary Broste
 Assistant Commissioner J. G. P. Michel Cabana
 Staff Sergeant Jean-Marc Collin
 Deputy Chief Troy Cooper
 Superintendent Robert Davis
 Chief Glenn De Caire
 Chief Henry DeLaronde
 Chief Frank Elsner
 Deputy Chief Eric Girt
 Chaplain R. A. (Bob) Harper
 Superintendent Timothy Head
 Sergeant Toby Hinton
 Superintendent Andrew Hobbs
 Superintendent Jamie Jagoe
 Director Kristine Kijewski
 Chief Superintendent Alphonse MacNeil
 Ms. Sylvie Mantha
 Superintendent Kathryn Martin
 Assistant Commissioner Dale McGowan
 Staff Superintendent Jeffrey McGuire
 Chief Stephen McIntyre
 Chief Superintendent Blair McKnight
 Staff Sergeant Terry McLachlan
 Detective Raymond Wai-Sang Miu
 Deputy Chief Robert Napier
 Chief Superintendent Richard Noble
 Detective Inspector Dennis Olinyk
 Deputy Chief Bernard Pannell
 Assistant Director Marc Parent
 Staff Sergeant Joseph Roch Stephen Patterson
 Assistant Director Mario Plante
 Chief Murray Rodd
 Staff Sergeant Stéphane St-Jacques
 Chief Joseph Tomei

Most Venerable Order of the Hospital of St. John of Jerusalem

Knights and Dames of the Order of St. John
 Her Honour, the Honourable Edna Elias
 J. Stuart Clyne
 Major Richard Choquette, CD
 The Honourable Noël Kinsella
 His Honour, the Honourable Douglas George Phillips
 His Honour, the Honourable Lester Tuccaro
 Norma Doreen Laird

Commanders of the Order of St. John
 Gary A. Jack
 Lieutenant-Colonel Paul John Tuz, CD
 Shelly Jenneane Burrows
 Robert H. White
 Commander Alaric John Martin Woodrow, CD
 Lieutenant-Colonel André M. Levesque, CD

Officers of the Order of St. John
 Sylvie Babin
 Leslie M. Brannagan
 Daniel Faucher
 Michael John Lawrence
 Mary Jo Rees
 Lieutenant-Colonel Richard Stepaniuk, CD,
 Lorne R. Heslop
 Nancy Katherine Hutchinson
 Commodore Hans W. Jung, CD
 Richard Lauzière
 Richard Neville

Members of the Order of St. John
 Lieutenant(N) Timothy Allen
 Andrew Lance Binette
 Randall Edward George Burtch 
 Major Michael T. A. Calnan
 Patricia JoAnn Copperthwaite
 Captain Silvio Neves Da Silva
 Corporal/Caporal Kathryn Ann Davis, CD
 Reverend Roman Dusanowskyj
 Lieutenant-Colonel (Retired) David Clarke Fletcher, CD
 Lieutenant-Colonel (Retired) George Thomas Frid
 Annick Gauthier
 Kimberly Irene Giddens
 Annabel Gills
 Monique Grambin-White
 Vivian Maria Sze Ngar Ho
 Nahum Ip
 Linda Patricia Kelly
 Greg S. Kobernick
 Stephanie A. Minshull
 Kimberley Dawn Mitchell
 Kevin R. Morgan
 Mark Henderson Pound
 Diane L. Presley
 Adam Jack Prieur
 Ryan William Smith
 Derek Matthew Vollrath
 Elizabeth Florence Waite
 Lois Diane Wilson 
 Lieutenant(N) Suzanne Debra Anderson, CD
 Maxime Boutin-Caron
 Harold Cameron Campbell
 Robert John Cristofoli
 Sergeant Andrew Shawn Daring
 Patricia Anne Dwyer
 Captain (Retired) Gary Robert Hayes, CD,
 Elaine Heinicke 
 Brigadier General, the Reverend Doctor David C. Kettle, CD
 David Alan King
 Carl Laurent Joseph Larouche
 Clive Law
 Ferguson Mobbs, CD
 Melanie Rose Peters
 Lisa Rowe
 Ivan Stevic
 Alexandra Sandy Tobler 
 Master Warrant Officer Maurice James Chapman

Provincial Honours

National Order of Québec

Grand Officers of the National Order of Québec

 Margaret Becklake, G.O.Q.
 Monique Miller, G.O.Q.
 Rosario Tremblay, G.O.Q.

Honorary Grand Officer of the National Order of Québec
 His Excellency Abdou Diouf, G.O.Q.

Officers of the National Order of Québec  

 Simon Brault, O.Q.
 Jean-Charles Coutu, O.Q.
 Jean-Marc Eustache, O.Q.
 Max Gros-Louis, O.Q.
 Christophe Guy, O.Q.
 GILLES JULIEN, O.Q.
 CLAUDE LABERGE, O.Q.
 RITA LAFONTAINE, O.Q.
 GILLES LOISELLE, O.Q.
 EMANUELE (LINO) SAPUTO, O.Q.
 ALVIN CRAMER SEGAL, O.Q.

Knight of the National Order of Québec

 ALAIN BEAUDET, C.Q.
 NATHALIE BONDIL, C.Q.
 MICHELINE BOUCHARD, C.Q.
 PIERRE BOUCHER, C.Q.
 MONIQUE C. CORMIER, C.Q.
 FRANÇOIS COUSINEAU, C.Q.
 PIERRE DALOZE, C.Q.
 JEAN-PAUL GRAPPE, C.Q.
 CÉCILE GRENIER, C.Q.
 PIERRE HARVEY, C.Q.
 FABIENNE LAROUCHE, C.Q.
 LOUIS LAVIGUEUR, C.Q.
 MONIQUE LEFEBVRE, C.Q.
 MICHEL MAZIADE, C.Q.
 MICHEL NOËL, C.Q.
 JEAN PERRAULT, C.Q.
 RUTH ROSE, C.Q.
 ÉRIC ST-PIERRE, C.Q.
 PAULINE WONG, C.Q.

Saskatchewan Order of Merit

 Chief Darcy M. Bear, S.O.M.
 Joseph L. Bourgault, S.O.M.
 Dr. Edward F. G. Busse, S.O.M., F.R.C.P.S.(C)
 Ronald Carson, S.O.M.
 Malcolm Jenkins, S.O.M.
 Courtney Milne, S.O.M. (1943‐2010) (posthumous)
 Dr. Karim W. Nasser, S.O.M.
 Shirley Schneider, S.O.M.
 Ruth Smillie, S.O.M.

Secret appointments
 His Excellency the Right Honourable David Johnston, Governor General and Commander-in-Chief of Canada, on the recommendation of the Chief of the Defence Staff, has awarded four Stars of Military Valour, two Medals of Military Valour, one Meritorious Service Cross (Military Division), three Meritorious Service Medals (Military Division) and two Mentions in Dispatches to members of the Canadian Special Operations Forces Command for military activities of high standard that have brought great honour to the Canadian Forces and to Canada. For security and operational reasons, recipients’ names and citations have not been released.

Military Valour Decorations

Star of Military Valour

 LIEUTENANT GABRIEL CHASSÉ-JEAN, S.M.V.
 MASTER WARRANT OFFICER RICHARD STACEY, S.M.V., C.D.

Medal of Military Valour

 SERGEANT T. DAVID BÉRUBÉ, M.M.V.
 MASTER CORPORAL SIMON R. FRIGON, M.M.V.
 SERGEANT JOSEPH MARTIN STÉPHANE MERCIER, M.M.V., C.D.
 LEADING SEAMAN PIER-VINCENT MICHAUD, M.M.V.
 SERGEANT JOSEPH DENIS FRANÇOIS RANGER, M.M.V., C.D.

Canadian Bravery Decorations

Star of Courage

 Angela Jeanette Stirk 
 Fontella Twoyoungmen (posthumous)
 Private Adam J. P. Fraser 
 Corporal Déri J. G. Langevin
 Kenneth Franklin Lehman
 Corporal Marc-André Poirier

Medal of Bravery

 Clermont Bélanger 
 Jean-Louis Clavet 
 Marie-Claude Élie 
 Serge Fournier 
 Robert Francoeur 
 Yvon Lévesque 
 Yvan Pruneau 
 Constable Jean-François Rousselle
 Michael Lee Anderson 
 Norman Anderson (posthumous) 
 RCMP Constable Andrew Ashton
 Brent Michael Blackmore
 Robert C. Bombardir 
 Leading Seaman Cory K. Bond 
 Darryl Fabian Boone 
 Kingsley Cheung 
 Darren Coogan 
 Archie L. Coughlin 
 Sergeant Delkie Curtis 
 Jubal Daley 
 Jewel Denison 
 Lieutenant(N) Christopher Michael Devita, C.D. 
 Ratko Ray Djuric 
 Constable Patrick Duerden 
 Brian Dean Fowlow 
 Dennis William Robert Fowlow
 Bonnie Gamble 
 Gordon Joseph Gamble 
 Krista Dorothy Girvan 
 Donald George Gough 
 Donald Neil Harper (posthumous) 
 Jeremy Hodder 
 Justin Kenneth Darwin Ilnicki 
 Matthew Michael Jackson
 Jewel James 
 Tara Michelle Josey 
 Nadine Anik Leduc 
 Tamsen Laine Lahnalampi 
 Kevin Joseph Leski 
 Tyler Norman David Lockerby 
 Dean Lucas 
 Tina Maryann Moores (posthumous) 
 RCMP Constable Shane Douglas Nicoll 
 Barry Ryder Nilsen 
 Patrick Robert O’Connor 
 Sergeant John K. Potts 
 Steven C. Reynolds 
 Wayne Reynolds 
 Timothy Andrew Rider 
 Sharon Yvonne Rider 
 Eric Roy (posthumous) 
 Vince P. Sharpe
 Sharon Rose Sparks 
 Chance Stewart 
 Constable Michelle Stinson 
 James Jacob Daniel Thede 
 Sergeant Roger Thomas 
 Pazia Toyne
 Vanna Jade Twoyoungmen 
 Major Frank Wagener 
 Glen William Watts 
 Constable Christopher C. Wells
 Russell Ryan Werner
 Sheldon Steven Willier
 Twain Wright
 Maxime Bondu 
 Sergeant André Coallier 
 Constable Scott Dargie 
 Steve Degrace 
 Denis Diotte 
 Monique Gagnon
 Constable Karine Giroux
 Kevin Gooding
 Bernard Keetash
 Richard Kelly (posthumous)
 Lana Mae Krieser 
 Constable George J. MacNeil
 André J. Maillet 
 J. Robert Maillet 
 William Edward Matthews 
 Constable Kris Miclash 
 Mark Montour
 Ross P. Moore 
 Jeffrey Neekan
 Geneviève Otis-Leduc
 Alexandre Phaneuf
 Constable David Pilote
 Jean-François Renault
 Tyler Glenn Sampson (posthumous)
 Madden Sarver
 Elaine Kathryne Spray (posthumous)
 Jakki Spray
 Frank William Taylor
 Constable Daniel Tétreault
 Kevin Thomas
 Philbert Truong (posthumous)
 Ian Joseph Wheeler, C.D. 
 Kathryn Whittaker

Meritorious Service Decorations

Meritorious Service Cross (Military Division)

 MAJOR TIMOTHY MAURICE ARSENAULT, M.S.C., C.D
 PETTY OFFICER 2nd CLASS MARTIN JOSEPH CLAUDE BÉDARD, M.S.C., C.D. 
 LIEUTENANT-COLONEL MARC BIGAOUETTE, M.S.C., C.D. 
 GENERAL FRANCISZEK GĄGOR, M.S.C. (Posthumous) (Polish Armed Forces) 
 CHIEF WARRANT OFFICER JULES JOSEPH MOREAU, M.M.M., M.S.C., C.D.
 LIEUTENANT-COLONEL JOCELYN J. M. J. PAUL, M.S.C., C.D. 
 GENERAL DAVID H. PETRAEUS, A.O., M.S.C. (United States Army)
 REAR-ADMIRAL TYRONE HERBERT WILLIAM PILE, C.M.M., M.S.C., C.D. 
 SERGEANT MICHAEL ADAM SMITH, M.S.C., C.D.
 LIEUTENANT-COLONEL GILBERT CLEMENT THIBAULT, M.S.C., C.D.
 LIEUTENANT-COLONEL CARL JEAN TURENNE, M.S.C., C.D. 
 BRIGADIER-GENERAL JONATHAN HOLBERT VANCE, O.M.M., M.S.C., C.D.

Meritorious Service Medal (Military Division)

 MAJOR DARRYL GORDON ADAMS, M.S.M., C.D. 
 COLONEL ANTHONY JOSEPH MARK HILAIRE ASHFIELD, M.S.M., C.D. 
 BRIGADIER-GENERAL ROBERT J. BELETIC, M.S.M., (United States Air Force)
 SERGEANT LEE WILLIAM EDWARD BIBBY, M.S.M., C.D. 
 MASTER CORPORAL STÉPHANE JOSEPH MICHEL RICHARD, M.S.M., C.D. 
 COLONEL GREGORY CHARLES BILTON, M.S.M. (Australian Army) 
 MAJOR EMANUEL JEANNOT BOUCHER, M.S.M., C.D. 
 CORPORAL MATHIEU S. BOULAY-PAILLÉ, M.S.M. 
 COLONEL GREGORY DAWSON BURT, O.M.M., M.S.M., C.D.
 MAJOR Trevor John Cadieu, M.S.M., C.D.
 MAJOR LUIS C. CARVALLO, M.S.M., C.D. 
 SERGEANT PATRICE PASCAL CHARTRAND, M.S.M., C.D.
 LIEUTENANT-COLONEL SCOTT NORMAN CLANCY, M.S.M., C.D.
 CAPTAIN MARC A. DAUPHIN, M.S.M., C.D. 
 MAJOR GENERAL MART C. DE KRUIF, M.S.M. (Royal Netherlands Army)
 LIEUTENANT-COLONEL ROLAND GRANT DELANEY, M.S.M., C.D.
 MASTER CORPORAL JONATHAN D. J. DÉZIEL, M.S.M.
 CHIEF WARRANT OFFICER JOSEPH RICHARD DENIS DOMPIERRE, M.S.M., C.D. 
 MAJOR JEAN-FRANÇOIS DUVAL, M.S.M., C.D.
 MAJOR J. R. MARIO FERLAND, M.S.M., C.D. 
 LIEUTENANT-COLONEL GYULA JOHN JOSEPH GERGELY, M.S.M., C.D. 
 LIEUTENANT-COLONEL LEE JOHN HAMMOND, M.S.M., C.D.
 COMMANDER CHRISTOPHER JOHN HARGREAVES, O.M.M., M.S.M., C.D.
 CORPORAL FRANÇOIS-JONATHAN GILLES MICHEL HÉBERT, M.S.M.
 SERGEANT WILLIAM JOSEPH KELLAND, M.S.M., C.D. 
 CAPTAIN ANDREW JOHN MERCER, M.S.M., C.D. 
 WARRANT OFFICER KEITH PAUL MITCHELL, C.V., M.S.M., C.D. 
 SERGEANT DAVID MICHAEL PAWULSKI, S.C., M.S.M., C.D. 
 LIEUTENANT-COLONEL JOSEPH JEAN-PAUL CHRISTIAN LABROSSE, M.S.M., C.D. 
 CHIEF WARRANT OFFICER GRÉGOIRE RAYMOND LACROIX, M.M.M., M.S.M., C.D.
 COLONEL JOSEPH CONRAD ROCH LACROIX, M.S.M., C.D.
 CAPTAIN FRANCIS JOSEPH MICHEL MALLET, M.S.M., C.D.
 SERGEANT CHARLES ANDREW MCLEAN, M.M.M., M.S.M., C.D.
 HONORARY COLONEL STANLEY A. MILNER, O.C., A.O.E., M.S.M., C.D
 MAJOR JOSEPH SERGE RAYNALD MORIN, M.S.M., C.D.
 MAJOR YANNICK PÉPIN, M.S.M., C.D. (Posthumous) 
 SERGEANT JOSEPH FRANÇOIS COLIN PICHÉ, M.S.M., C.D.
 COLONEL JOHN BRUCE PLOUGHMAN, M.S.M., C.D.
 CHIEF WARRANT OFFICER JOSEPH GERARD GILBERT POIRIER, M.M.M., M.S.M., C.D.
 CHIEF WARRANT OFFICER ERNEST GÉRARD JOSEPH POITRAS, M.S.M., C.D. 
 LIEUTENANT-COLONEL JAMES JOSEPH RAOUL NORMAND RICHARDSON, M.S.M., C.D. 
 COLONEL MARIE CÉLINE DANIELLE SAVARD, M.S.M., C.D.
 MAJOR PAUL SCANNELL, M.S.M. (British Army)
 CHIEF WARRANT OFFICER ANDREW PETER STAPLEFORD, M.S.M., C.D.
 HONORARY CAPTAIN (N) CEDRIC STEELE, M.S.M., C.D.
 LIEUTENANT-COLONEL ANN-MARIE BRIGITTE TARDIF, M.S.M., C.D.
 LIEUTENANT-COLONEL JOHN TRINGALI, M.S.M. (United States Air Force)
 MAJOR JOSEPH RICHARD MARC VERRET, M.S.M., C.D.
 LIEUTENANT-COLONEL MICHAEL WHITED, M.S.M. (United States Army)

Mention in Dispatches 
 Master Corporal Étienne Aubé 
 Sergeant Sébastien Joseph Yves Belval 
 Master Corporal Isabelle Corbeil 
 Warrant Officer Joseph Jean Denis Justin Côté, C.D. 
 Corporal Guillaume De Celles 
 Sergeant Joseph Gaetan Phillippe Jr. Dessureault, C.D.
 Sergeant Bjorn Ivo Dittmar 
 Sergeant Joseph André Jacques Sylvain Énault, C.D. 
 Master Corporal Francis Fréchette 
 Private William Allen Geernaert 
 Captain David Lacombe
 Corporal Antonin Ladet 
 Master Corporal Simon Lavoie 
 Sergeant Joseph Yvan Richard Lecavalier, C.D. 
 Sergeant Oliver Lee
 Captain Christian Maranda 
 Corporal Martin Matte 
 Corporal Jona Nlandu 
 Captain Manuel Pelletier-Bédard 
 Corporal Billy Pilote-Jobin 
 Private Dave Potvin
 Sergeant Éric Adolphe Renaud, C.D. 
 Master Corporal Steven Robertson, C.D. 
 Corporal Kevin Rowland 
 Captain Mathieu Saikaly 
 Petty Officer 2nd Class Kenneth Richard White, C.D. 
 Corporal Joseph Luc Richard Lareau 
 Captain Kurt Evan Schweitzer 
 Sergeant Joseph Michel Côté 
 Master Corporal Simon Girard 
 Corporal Simon-Pierre Larochelle 
 Private Samuel Côté 
 Private Mathieu Sansoucy

Commonwealth and Foreign Orders, Decorations and Medal awarded to Canadians

From Her Majesty The Queen in Right of Australia

Australian Service Medal with “Timor Leste” clasp
 Warrant Officer Dominic Thomas Clarke

Australian Active Service Medal with International Coalition Against Terrorism clasp
 Major Jason C. Kenny
 Captain Douglas B. Publicove

From Her Majesty The Queen in Right of the United Kingdom

Operational Service Medal (Afghanistan)
 Captain Scott Donald Lloyd
 Lieutenant-Colonel Lawrence Donald William Haisell
 Captain Jean-Marc Fugulin
 Captain Marcel Rochat
 Master Corporal Clarence Hamilton Smith
 Major Jeremy Keith Alexander Fountain
 Major Andrew James Hewitt
 Captain Jameel J. Janjua
 Captain Martin Duchesneau

Operational Service Medal (Iraq)
 Major Stephen William Carius
 Captain Philip Alastair Rennison
 Captain Jean-Marc Fugulin

From the President of Austria

Cross of Honour for Science and Art 1st Class
 Dr. Harry Schachter

Grand Decoration of Honour
 Mr. Michael Novac

Grand Decoration of Honour for Services to Austria
 Professor Julio Montaner

From His Majesty the King of the Belgians

Commander of the Order of the Crown
 Mr. Benoît Pelletier

Civic Medal, 1st class 
 Ms. Christine Osteux

From the President of Finland

Cross of Merit of the Order of the Lion of Finland
 Mr. Sauli Häkkinen
 Mr. Pentti Henrik Järvenpää

From the President of France

Grand Cross of the National Order of the Legion of Honour
 The Right Honourable Michaëlle Jean, P.C., C.C., C.M.M, C.O.M., C.D.

Commander of the National Order of the Legion of Honour
 General Walter Natynczyk 
 The Honourable Louise Arbour

Officer of the National Order of the Legion of Honour 
 The Honourable Daniel P. Hays
 The Honourable Donald Johnston
 Mrs. Marie-Josée Kravis
 Mrs. Liliane Stewart
 Dr. Michel Chrétien

Knight of the National Order of the Legion of Honour 
 Mrs. Jacqueline Desmarais
 Mr. Arthur Haché
 Mrs. Yolande Cohen
 Mrs. Michèle Stanton-Jean
 Mr. Pierre Lavallée 
 Mr. Pierre Théberge

Grand Officer of the National Order of Merit
 Mr. Herménégilde Chiasson

Officer of the National Order of Merit
 Colonel Georges Rousseau
 Ms. Louise Limoges

Knight of the National Order of Merit
 Lieutenant-Colonel Laurent Caux
 Mrs. Lynn Gagnon

Commander of the Order of the Academic Palms
 Mr. Dominique-Louis Piron
 Mr. Benoît Pelletier

Knight of the Order of the Academic Palms
 Mr. Louis Allain 
 Ms. Dominique Égée 
 Mr. Wally Lazaruk 
 Ms. Jacqueline Marthone-Kernisant
 Ms. Carole Saint-Louis
 Mrs. Lyse-Ann Bélanger
 Mrs. Louise Lewin Bengualid
 Mr. Roger Delisle
 Mr. Bernard Grève
 Mr. Jean-Paul Létourneau
 Mr. Jacques Marois
 Mrs. Christina Angers Serafin
 Mr. Andrew J. B. (John) Johnston
 Mr. Ghassan Helou 
 Mrs. Eliane Camerlynck
 Mr. Laurier Fortin

Officer of the Order of Agricultural Merit
 Mr. Denis Marsan

Knight of the Order of Agricultural Merit
 Mr. Pierre Jury
 Mrs. Laura Calder

Officer of the Order of Arts and Letters 
 Mr. Dany Laferrière
 Mr. Robert Lepage

Knight of the Order of Arts and Letters 
 Mrs. Marie Gignac
 Mr. Jacques Girard
 Mr. Bruno Laplante
 Mr. Paul Lefebvre
 Mrs. Ginette Reno
 Mrs. Nicole Sévigny
 Mr. Jim Sinclair
 Mrs. Michèle Valiquette
 Mr. Jeff Wall
 Mr. Dominique Denis 
 Mrs. Estelle Desfossés 
 Mr. Jacques Emond 
 Mrs. Louise Forand-Samson 
 Mrs. Ginette Gauthier 
 Mr. Jean-François Paquin 
 Mrs. Danielle Poiré
 Mrs. Esther Trépanier

National Defence Medal, Gold Echelon with Gendarmerie Nationale Clasp
 Superintendent Mark Archiebald Mc Gowan
 Assistant Commissioner William Allan Smith

National Defence Medal, Silver Echelon with “armée de l’air” clasp
 Colonel Sylvain Bédard

National Defence Medal, Silver Echelon
 Colonel Michael Pearson Cessford

National Defence Medal, Bronze Echelon with Gendarmerie Nationale Clasp
 Staff Sergeant Jim Power
 Staff Sergeant Major David R. Tipple

National Defence Medal (Bronze Echelon)
 Warrant-Officer Vincent Gagnon

Foreign Affairs Medal of Honour (Bronze)
 Mrs. Judite Varela

From the President of Germany

Honour Cross of the German Armed Forces
 Major Pierre Lépine

Cross of the Order of Merit
 Mr. Gerhard Spindler
 Mrs. Helene Maria Bolte

From the President of Honduras

Order of Merit 
 Mr. Daniel Arsenault

From the President of Hungary

Knight's Cross of the Order of Merit 
 Ms. Agnes Bessenyei
 Professor Alan Walker

From the President of Italy

Commander of the Order of Merit
 Mr. Pier Angelo Paternieri

Knight of the Order of Merit
 Mr. Carmine Virginio D’Argenio
 Mr. Emilio B. Imbriglio
 Mr. Giuseppe Cosimo Maiolo
 Mr. Benito Migliorati
 Mr. Paolo Venerino Tamburello
 Ms. Rosanna La Valle

Knight of the Order of Merit for Labour
 Mr. Teodoro Ottaviano

Grand Officer of the Order of the Star of Solidarity
 The Most Reverend James Martin Hayes

Knight of the Order of the Star of Solidarity
 Mr. Ferdinando Bisinella
 Mr. Donato Caivano
 Mrs. Giovanna Del Vecchio
 Mrs. Imelda Facchin
 Mrs. Franca Giacomelli
 Mr. Renzo Orsi
 Mr. Eligio Adolfo Paris
 Mr. Calogero Puma
 Mr. Walter Simone
 Mrs. Luisa Zoncheddu Solinas

From His Majesty The Emperor of Japan

Grand Cordon of the Order of the Rising Sun
 The Right Honourable Brian Mulroney, P.C., C.C., G.O.Q.

Order of the Rising Sun, Gold Rays
 Ms. Joy Nozomi Kogawa

Order of the Rising Sun, Gold and Silver Star
 The Honourable Bryon Wilfert

Order of the Rising Sun, Gold and Silver Star
 The Honourable Bryon Wilfert

Order of the Rising Sun, Gold Rays with Neck Ribbon
 Mr. Albert Diamond Cohen
 Mr. John William Craig

Order of the Rising Sun, Gold Rays with Rosette
 Mr. Yuzuru Kojima

Order of the Rising Sun, Gold and Silver Rays
 Mr. William Moncrief

Order of the Rising Sun, Silver Rays
 Mr. Yoichi Saegusa
 Mr. Yoshihisa Nagaishi

From the President of Latvia

Order of the Three Stars
 Mrs. Inta Purvs

From the President of Lithuania

Commander's Cross of the Order of Merit 
 Dr. Biruté Galdikas

From His Royal Highness The Grand Duke of Luxembourg, Duke of Nassau

Commander Order of the Oak Crown
 The Honourable Philippe Kirsch

From Her Majesty The Queen of the Netherlands

Member of the Order of Orange-Nassau 
 Mrs. Ria Koster

From the Secretary General of the North Atlantic Treaty Organization

Meritorious Service Medal
 Lieutenant-General Jan Arp
 Chief Petty Officer 1st Class Martial Côté
 Brigadier-General David A. Fraser
 Major Stephen Hanson
 Lieutenant-Colonel Allan Francis Walsh
 Commander Richard Leo Perks
 Brigadier-General Kenneth A. Corbould

From the President of Poland

Officer's Cross of the Order of Merit
 Mr. Benedykt Bylicki
 Mr. Wilhelm Siemienski
 Dr. Frank Dimant 
 Mr. Walter Perchal
 Dr. Ryszarda Russ-Pasowski

Knight's Cross of the Order of Merit
 Mr. Roger Furmanczyk
 Mrs. Bogumila Szulc
 Mr. Zdzislaw Marczynski (posthumous)
 Mr. Jozef Tadeusz Bigder
 Mr. Maksymilian Kubacki (posthumous)
 Mr. Jozef T. Kazimowicz

Officer's Cross of the Order of Polonia Restituta
 Mr. Zdzislaw Krynski
 Mr. Stanislaw Lasek
 Mr. Bogdan Idzikowski

Gold Cross of Merit
 Mr. Samuel Wenzel Billich
 Mr. Stefan Padowicz
 Mrs. Wladyslawa Rolicz
 Mrs. Teresa Sobol
 Mr. Stefan Wladysiuk
 Mrs. Anna Czerwinska (posthumous)
 Mrs. Czeslawa Janowska
 Mr. Wladyslaw Gladkowski (posthumous)
 Mr. Zbroislaw Orzechowski
 Mrs. Maria Osadca 
 Mr. Kajetan Bieniecki
 Mr. Ryszard Bojarski
 Mr. Andrzej Bortnowski
 Mr. Euzebiusz Jadlowski (posthumous)
 Mr. Tadeusz Kubow
 Mrs. Elzbieta Lyszkiewicz
 Mrs. Barbara Pinkowska
 Mr. Tadeusz Pinkowski (posthumous)
 Mr. Edward Rolicz
 Mr. Waclaw Zakrzewski (posthumous)
 Mr. Zbigniew Bieniawski
 Mr. Zygmunt Horawski
 Mr. Zygmunt Lender
 Mrs. Regina Sadowska

Silver Cross of Merit
 Mr. Marek Balazinski
 Mrs. Bozena Chylewska
 Mr. Stanislaw Chylewski
 Mr. Alfred Halasa
 Mr. Andrzej Jarosz
 Mrs. Wanda Smoragiewicz
 Mr. Antoni Kostka
 Mrs. Bozena Ewa Augustyniak
 Mrs. Barbara Gaczowska
 Mrs. Alina Danuta Kapuscinska
 Mr. Zrzysztof Kosewski
 Mr. Zbigniew Nawrot
 Mrs. Jolanta Woznowska-Vu
 Mr. Jan Kaminski

Bronze Cross of Merit
 Mrs. Grazyna Nawrot

Long Term Marriage Relationship Medal
 Mr. Andrew Boleslaw Pernal 
 Mrs. Nan Barton Pernal

From the President of Russia

Order of Friendship
 Mrs. Anna Varpakhovskaya

Pushkin Medal
 Mr. Andrew Donskov
 Mrs. Donna Tussing Orwin
 Professor John Stuart Durrant
 Ms. Natalia Taryshkina

Medal for the Merits in Exploring Outer Space
 Dr. Robert Brent Thirsk

From His Majesty The King of Spain

Cross of the Order of Naval Merit with White Distinction
 Mr. Jean-Pierre Andrieux

From His Majesty The King of Thailand

Member of The Most Noble Order of the Crown 
 Dr. Kevin McCormick

From the President of Ukraine

Order of Merit, 3rd Class
 Dr. Julia Woychyshyn

From the Government of the United States of America

Officer of the Legion of Merit 
 Lieutenant-General Jan Arp
 Brigadier-General Camil Giguère
 Brigadier-General Nicholas E. Matern
 Brigadier-General Alan J. Howard
 Brigadier-General Paul Wynnyk
 Brigadier-General Gary J. O’Brien
 Captain (N) Alain L. Garceau
 Brigadier-General Nicolas E. Matern
 Brigadier-General Douglas C. Hilton
 Colonel Michael J. Pearson
 Major-General Michael J. Ward

Bronze Star Medal
 Colonel Kevin R. Cotten
 Colonel Michael R. Dabros
 Lieutenant-Colonel Kevin Tyler
 Colonel Dave E. Barr
 Major Kevin Billinghurst
 Lieutenant-Colonel Kevin F. Bryski
 Major Philip Hernen
 Brigadier-General David A. Fraser
 Colonel Marc R. Gagné
 Colonel David G. Henley
 Lieutenant-Colonel Scott G. Long
 Major Sean B. Wyatt

Meritorious Service Medal
 Captain Mark Ihab Abraham
 Major Donna Lee Allen
 Major Patrice Beauchamp
 Captain (N) Richard J. J. R. Bergeron
 Major David S. Blackburn
 Major Douglas R. Bugeaud
 Major Alain Dallaire
 Major Gabriel Doré
 Lieutenant-Commander Paul E. Francoeur
 Lieutenant-Commander Craig L. Marsh
 Lieutenant-Colonel James A. McLean
 Major Jason C. Randall
 Major David R. Rudnicki
 Major Glenn C. Barbour
 Colonel Sylvain Bédard 
 Colonel William N. Brough 
 Major Martin Dufour 
 Warrant Officer Kenneth E. Johnson 
 Chief Warrant Officer William T. McCarroll 
 Lieutenant-Colonel Jacques J. Pellan
 Lieutenant (N) Antoine Bakhache
 Major Ernest K. Crowell
 Major Marla Dow
 Major Krista Dunlop
 Lieutenant-Colonel James Duquette
 Master Warrant Officer Darcy S. Elder
 Chief Petty Officer Second Class Michael Fairfex
 Colonel Robert A. Geddes
 Lieutenant-Colonel Perry A. S. Grandy
 Lieutenant-Colonel Stephen R. Kelsey
 Major James T. Kenney
 Lieutenant-Colonel Eric Kenny
 Captain Kurt T. Patrick
 Lieutenant-Colonel John M. Trayner
 Major Marc Bouchard
 Colonel André H. Dupuis
 Major Donald R. Henley
 Colonel Stephen G. Laplante
 Corporal Christopher J. Latta
 Captain Kevin J. MacDonald
 Major Randle C. Moon
 Major Wallace J. Noseworthy
 Major Wade G. Oliver
 Major Marc Parent
 Lieutenant-Colonel Bruno Plourde
 Master Warrant Officer Alain Poirier
 Major Kevin Poirier
 Lieutenant-Commander Martin Raymond
 Major Todd A. Smart
 Captain Kenneth R. Stewart
 Lieutenant-Colonel Pierre C. St-Laurent
 Lieutenant-Colonel Ewen A. Wrighte
 Major Brent A. Clute
 Lieutenant Commander Shaina C. Leonard
 Major Michael Ashcroft
 Brigadier-General Stephen J. Bowes
 Major Brent A. Kerr
 Lieutenant-Commander Ken Osborne
 Major Desmond Brophy
 Lieutenant-Colonel Shawn D. Bindon 
 Major Brian G. Carver
 Chief Warrant Officer David J. Fischer
 Lieutenant-Colonel Ronald Allison
 Lieutenant-Colonel Patrick B. Carpentier
 Major Jeffrey D. Daly
 Brigadier-General Hilary Jaeger
 Major Brian P. Nekurak
 Warrant Officer Andrew Quinn
 Warrant Officer Kenneth M. Reynolds
 Major Michael Sears
 Major Keith A. Taylor
 Major Robert G. Watters
 Captain Peter R. Casey 
 Major Jean-Pierre Lafleur 
 Colonel John J. Milne
 Major Marcel Farley
 Lieutenant-Commander David S. Martin

Air Medal, First Oak Leaf Cluster
 Major Michael U. McCarthy

Air Medal
 Captain Bruce Bell
 Major Juan C. Gallego
 Captain Darren J. MacIsaac
 Major Michael U. McCarthy
 Warrant-Officer Harold Shortt
 Major Leonard M. Wappler
 Major Leonard A. Kosciukiewicz
 Master Corporal Jerry T. Larkin
 Warrant-Officer Richard B. Mongeon
 Warrant-Officer Marc H. Pilon
 Major Gerald R. D. Anderson
 Major David K. Helfenstein
 Warrant Officer Stephen M. Heus
 Captain Stephen MacLeish
 Captain David A. McNiff
 Captain Quinton V. Oliviero
 Captain Joshua Riley
 Captain Donald T. Saunders
 Sergeant David K. Joy 
 Sergeant Robert C. Kerr 
 Sergeant James R. McCarron 
 Warrant Officer J. B. McLaren 
 Captain Ryan J. L. O’Neill
 Master Corporal Chris A. Walsh
 Captain Christopher J. Horner
 Major Scott G. Marshall
 Sergeant Theresa K. McLaren
 Lieutenant William A. Natynczyk

Erratums of Commonwealth and Foreign Orders, Decorations and Medal awarded to Canadians

Corrected on 12 March 2011
 The notice published on page 3086 of the December 4, 2010 issue of the Canada Gazette, Part I, is hereby amended as follows: From the President of France, the National Defence Medal, Silver Echelon with clasp “Infantry” to Captain Kevin Crowell and Lieutenant-Colonel Jacques Pellan 
 The notice published on page 146 of the January 29, 2011 issue of the Canada Gazette, Part I, is hereby amended as follows: From His Majesty The Emperor of Japan, the Order of the Rising Sun, Gold Rays with Rosette to Mrs. Joy Nozomi Kogawa

Corrected on 30 April 2011
 The notice published on page 864 of the March 12, 2011, issue of the Canada Gazette, Part I, is hereby amended as follows: From the President of Poland, the Silver Cross of Merit to Mrs. Grazyna Nawrot 
 The notice published on page 1073 of the March 26, 2011, issue of the Canada Gazette, Part I, is hereby amended as follows: From the President of the United States of America, the Meritorious Service Medal to Captain (N) Kenneth R. Stewart

References 

Monarchy in Canada